Krasnovka , rural localities in Russia, may refer to:

 Krasnovka, Bryansk Oblast, a village
 Krasnovka, Kursk Oblast, a khutor
 Krasnovka, Krasnoyarsk Krai, a village
 Krasnovka, Chernyakhovsky District, Kaliningrad Oblast, a settlement
 Krasnovka, Zelenogradsky District, Kaliningrad Oblast, a settlement
 Krasnovka, Lebedyansky District, Lipetsk Oblast, a village
 Krasnovka, Terbunsky District, Lipetsk Oblast, a village
 Krasnovka, Kulebaksky District, Nizhny Novgorod Oblast, a village
 Krasnovka, Sharangsky District, Nizhny Novgorod Oblast, a village
 Krasnovka, Chulymsky District, Novosibirsk Oblast, a settlement
 Krasnovka, Kuybyshevsky District, Novosibirsk Oblast, a village
 Krasnovka, Kamensky District, Rostov Oblast, a khutor
 Krasnovka, Tarasovsky District, Rostov Oblast, a khutor
 Krasnovka, Samara Oblast, a village
 Krasnovka, Tambov Oblast, a village